Junior Kilat is a Filipino reggae, ska and dub band based in Cebu City, Cebu, Philippines. The name is taken from the 1970s Cebu band Leon Kilat, which the latter group claims, was first to sing about "Agta". They are a popular reggae band in Manila, winning a "Song Of The Year Award" in NU-107's Rock Awards for Ako Si M16, their first single from the album party pipol ur on dub tv.

The bandais composed of Errol "Budoy" Marabiles on vocals, Tiano Evangelista on bass, Archie Ybañez on guitar, Bangin Atienza on turntable, Gina Pestaño on keyboards, Cleofas Quijano on trombone and Diana Freese on drums. Former guitarist Jad Dapat  is now part of the Electronica/Dub group Kahibaloo and The Science Project, a Dubstep-Minimalist group, in Australia.

Albums
The group's first release was on the 2004 album Island Riddims which featured two of their tracks: K-Fyne and Original Sigbin. Both were performed live at The Baseline in Cebu City. Their second appearance was in the Island Krismas album with their track Kling Klang.

Their first album, party pipol ur on dub tv, was released in 2005. Some of the tracks in this album were studio-recorded, others performed live at Idiot Board, also in Cebu City.

Their second album was entitled Buwad Suka Sili and contains five tracks, two music videos and The Making of Ako Si M16 video. The video of K-Fyne is also included in the album. The lineup of Junior Kilat changed for this album. Jad Dapat, formerly the group's guitarist, left the band and Arcie Ybañez took over his duties.

Currently, they have a new album, Enrique De Malacca. The carrier single of the said album is "1-2-3".

ABS-CBN collaboration
Junior Kilat currently features in a Cebu-based channel RCTV  show, Ismol Tym, in which Diana Freese, Tiano Evangelista and Gina Pestaño are staff members. Errol "Budoy" Marabiles also joined Pinoy Big Brother Celebrity Edition, an ABS-CBN production. He has written two songs for the show, Maligo Na Jam, which began as a poem he wrote while inside the Pinoy Big Brother house, and Budoy Ako, the Cebuano version of Pinoy Ako.

Discography and Track Listings with Duration
Island Riddims
K-Fyne
Original Sigbin 
Island Krismas
Kling Klang
party pipol ur on dub tv
Sigbin dub (4:59)
Party pipol ur on TV live
Lansyaw Gimadkaw
A.k.a. Otap live
Agta dub (3:46)
Agta live
Kling klang dub
Suyop live (5:06)
K-Fyne live (4:17)
Kung di pa lang sala (4:50)
Suyop dub
Ako si M16 (4:37)
Buwad Suka Sili
Buwad Suka Sili (5:13)
Lubot sa Yawa
Sigbin Rekonstruktion
Budoy Ako (4:02)
Buwad Suka Sili (Radio Edit)
Enrique De Malacca
Lumay
Katyubong
1-2-3 (4:23)
Lumay
Ungo Dub

Awards

References

Filipino rock music groups
Cebuano rock bands
Musical groups from Cebu City
Filipino reggae musical groups
Musical groups established in 2004
Visayan people